The Walter Byers Scholar (also known as Walter Byers Scholarship, and Walter Byers Postgraduate Scholarship) program is a scholarship program that recognizes the top male and female student-athlete in NCAA sports and that is awarded annually by the National Collegiate Athletic Association (NCAA). It is considered to be the NCAA's highest academic award. The NCAA initiated the Walter Byers Scholarship program in 1988 in recognition of the service of Walter Byers. The award is a postgraduate scholarship program designed to encourage excellence in academic performance by student-athletes. The recipients each year are the one male and one female student-athlete who has combined the best elements of mind and body to achieve national distinction for his or her achievements, and who promises to be a future leader in his or her chosen field of career service. Winners receive scholarships for postgraduate study.

Details
, the stipend for each Byers Scholarship was $24,000 for an academic year. The scholarship amount is adjusted for the cost of living. The grant may be renewed for a second year based on academic progress. Financial need is not a factor in the granting of these scholarships. United States citizenship is not required to satisfy eligibility requirements. Awards from other sources will not disqualify an applicant, except that an awardee may not use more than one NCAA postgraduate scholarship. The Walter Byers Postgraduate Scholarship Program is separate and distinct from the NCAA Postgraduate Scholarship Program, which provides annual awards with smaller stipends.

The five-person Walter Byers Scholarship Committee, established by the NCAA membership and appointed by the NCAA Divisions I, II and III Management Councils, administers the program. The committee membership is required to include at least one man and one woman, at least one member from each division and subdivision of Division I, and one member each from Division II and Division III.

Among the most recognized for post-athletic career accomplishments are Randal Pinkett and Rob Pelinka. Of the winners the one most notable for having gone professional in his or her sport is National Football League veteran Rob Zatechka, who later went on to medical school.

Several winners have won other notable awards.  The following are lists of dual winners of a selected set of notable awards:
Rhodes Scholar - Henderson, Thigpen, Pinkett
Top VIII Award - Black, Roethlisberger, Busbee, Carney
NCAA Woman of the Year Award - Black, Bersagel

Winners
The historical winners are as follows:

See also
Academic All-America
List of Academic All-America Team Members of the Year
Elite 89 Award
NCAA Sportsmanship Award (student-athletes who have demonstrated one or more of the ideals of sportsmanship)
Today's Top VIII Award (NCAA) (outstanding senior student-athletes)
NCAA Woman of the Year Award (senior female student-athlete)
Silver Anniversary Awards (NCAA) (former student-athletes)

Notes

External links
Walter Byers Postgraduate Scholarship Program
2007 finalists

NCAA awards
College sports trophies and awards in the United States
Student athlete awards in the United States
Scholarships in the United States
Awards established in 1988